The Moomins are the central characters in a series of novels, short stories, and a comic strip by Finnish writer and illustrator Tove Jansson, originally published in Swedish by Schildts in Finland. They are a family of white, round fairy-tale characters with large snouts that make them resemble the hippopotamus. However, despite this resemblance, the Moomin family are trolls. The family live in their house in Moominvalley and have had many adventures with their various friends.

In all, nine books were released in the series, together with five picture books and a comic strip being released between 1945 and 1993.

The Moomins have since been the basis for numerous television series, films and even two theme parks: one called Moomin World in Naantali, Finland, and another Akebono Children's Forest Park in Hannō, Saitama, Japan.

Etymology 
In a letter to Paul Ariste, an Estonian linguist, Jansson wrote in 1973 that she had created an artificial word which expresses something soft. She came up with an ad hoc Swedish word , because, in her opinion, the consonant sound of m in particular conveys a sensation of softness. As an artist, Jansson gave the Moomins a shape that also expresses softness, as opposed to flabbiness.

Synopsis and characters 

The Moomin stories concern several eccentric and oddly-shaped characters, some of whom are related to each other. The central family consists of Moominpappa, Moominmamma and Moomintroll.

Other characters, such as Hemulens, Sniff, the Snork Maiden, Snufkin and Little My are accepted into or attach themselves to the family group from time to time, generally living separate lives in the surrounding Moominvalley, where the series is set, and in which the Moomin family decides to live at the end of The Moomins and the Great Flood.

Characters 
 Moomintroll, also referred to as "Moomin" in some of the English translations: The main protagonist, the little boy of the family, interested in and excited about everything he sees and finds, always trying to be good, but sometimes getting into trouble while doing so; he is very brave and always finds a way to make his friends happy.
 Moominpappa: Orphaned in his younger years, he is a somewhat restless soul who left the orphanage to venture out into the world in his youth but has now settled down, determined to be a responsible father to his family.
 Moominmamma: The calm mother, who takes care that Moominhouse is a safe place to be. She wants everyone to be happy, appreciates individuality, but settles things when someone is wronged. She always brings good food as well as whatever else may be necessary on a journey in her handbag.
 Little My: A mischievous little girl, who lives in the Moomin house and has a brave, spunky personality. She likes adventure, but loves catastrophes, and often does mean things on purpose. She finds messiness and untidiness exciting and is very down to earth when others are not.
 Sniff: A creature who lives in the Moomin house. He likes to take part in everything, but is afraid to do anything dangerous. Sniff appreciates all valuables and makes many plans to get rich, but does not succeed.
 Snork Maiden: Moomin's friend. She is happy and energetic, but often suddenly changes her mind on things. She loves nice clothes and jewelry and is a little flirtatious. She thinks of herself as Moomin's girlfriend.
 Snufkin: Moomin's best friend. The lonesome philosophical traveller, who likes to play the harmonica and wanders around the world with only a few things, so as not to make his life complicated. He always comes and goes as he pleases, is carefree and has many admirers in Moominvalley. He is also shown to be quite fearless and calm in even the most dire situations, which has proven to be a great help to Moomintroll and the others when in danger.
 The younger Mymble, also referred to as "the Mymble's daughter": Little My's amiable and helpful big sister, and half-sister of Snufkin. She often has romantic daydreams about the love of her life, particularly policemen.
 The Snork: Snorkmaiden's brother. He is an introvert by nature and is always inventing things. The residents of Moominvalley often ask Snork for help solving tricky problems and building machines. Snorks are like moomintrolls, but change colour according to their mood.
 Too-Ticky: A wise woman, and good friend of the family. She has a boyish look, with a blue hat and a red-striped shirt. She dives straight into action to solve dilemmas in a practical way. Too-Ticky is the one of the people in Moominvalley, who does not hibernate, instead spending the winter in the small changing shed and storehouse over the water at the end of the Moomin's summer landing stage.
 Stinky: A small furry creature that always plays jokes on the family in the house, where he sometimes lives. He likes pinching things, is proud of his reputation as a crook, but always gets found out. He is simple and only thinks of himself.

Biographical interpretation 

Critics have interpreted various Moomin characters as being inspired by real people, especially members of the author's family, and Tove Jansson spoke in interviews about the backgrounds of, and possible models for, her characters. The first two books about the Moomins (The Moomins and the Great Flood and (Comet in Moominland) were published in 1945 and 1946 respectively, and deal with natural disasters; they were influenced by the upheavals of war and Jansson's depression during the war years. The reception of the first two Moomin books was lukewarm at first; the second book got a little more attention than its predecessor, but its sales figures were still poor. Third book, Finn Family Moomintroll, which was the first Moomin book translated into English, became the first international bestseller.

Tove Jansson's life partner was the graphic artist Tuulikki Pietilä, whose personality inspired the character Too-Ticky in Moominland Midwinter. Moomintroll and Little My have been seen as psychological self-portraits of the artist. The Moomins, generally speaking, relate strongly to Jansson's own family – they were bohemian, lived close to nature and were very tolerant towards diversity. Moominpappa and Moominmamma are often seen as portraits of Jansson's parents Viktor Jansson and Signe Hammarsten-Jansson. Most of Jansson's characters are on the verge of melancholy, such as the always formal Hemulen, or the strange Hattifatteners, who travel in concerted, ominous groups. Jansson uses the differences between the characters' philosophies to provide a venue for her satirical impulses.

List of books 

The books in the series, in order, are:

 The Moomins and the Great Flood (Originally: Småtrollen och den stora översvämningen) – 1945.
 Comet in Moominland (Originally: Kometjakten/Kometen kommer) – 1946.
 Finn Family Moomintroll, Some editions: The Happy Moomins –(Originally: Trollkarlens hatt) – 1948.
 The Exploits of Moominpappa, Some editions: Moominpappa's Memoirs (Originally: Muminpappans bravader/Muminpappans memoarer) – 1950.
 Moominsummer Madness (Originally: Farlig midsommar) – 1954.
 Moominland Midwinter (Originally: Trollvinter) – 1957.
 Tales from Moominvalley (Originally: Det osynliga barnet) – 1962 (Short stories).
 Moominpappa at Sea (Originally: Pappan och havet) – 1965.
 Moominvalley in November (Originally: Sent i november) – 1970 (In which the Moomin family is absent).

All of the books in the main series except The Moomins and the Great Flood (Originally: Småtrollen och den stora översvämningen) were translated and published in English during the 1960s and 70s. This first book would eventually be translated into English in 2005 by David McDuff and published by Schildts of Finland for the 60th anniversary of the series. A later 2012 version of the same translation, featuring Jansson's new preface to the 1991 Scandinavian printing, was published in Britain by Sort of Books, and was more widely distributed.

There are also five Moomin picture books by Tove Jansson:
 The Book about Moomin, Mymble and Little My (Originally: Hur gick det sen?) – 1952.
 Who Will Comfort Toffle? (Originally: Vem ska trösta knyttet?) – 1960.
 The Dangerous Journey (Originally: Den farliga resan) – 1977.
 Skurken i Muminhuset (English: Villain in the Moominhouse) – 1980
 Visor från Mumindalen (English: Songs from Moominvalley) – 1993 (No English translation published).

The first official translation of Villain in the Moominhouse by Tove Jansson historian Ant O'Neill was premiered in a reading at the ArchWay With Words literary festival on 25 September 2017.

The books and comic strips have been translated from their original Swedish and English respectively into many languages. The Book about Moomin, Mymble and Little My is the first Moomin book to be adapted for iPad.

Comic strips

The Moomins also appeared in the form of comic strips. Their first appearance was in 1947 in the children's section of the Ny Tid newspaper, and they were introduced internationally to English readers in 1954 in the popular London newspaper The Evening News. Tove Jansson drew and wrote all the strips until 1959. She shared the work load with her brother Lars Jansson until 1961; after that he took over the job until 1975 when the last strip was released.

Drawn & Quarterly, a Canadian graphic novel publisher, released reprints of all The Evening News strips created by both Tove and Lars Jansson beginning in October 2006. The first five volumes, Moomin: The Complete Tove Jansson Comic Strip have been published, whilst the sixth volume, published in May 2011, began Moomin: The Complete Lars Jansson Comic Strip. The 2015 publication Moomin: The Deluxe Anniversary Edition collected all of Tove's work.

In the 1990s, a comic book version of Moomin was produced in Scandinavia after Dennis Livson and Lars Jansson's animated series was shown on television. Neither Tove nor Lars Jansson had any involvement in these comic books; however, in the wake of the series, two new Moomin comic strips were launched under the artistic and content oversight of Lars and his daughter, Sophia Jansson-Zambra. Sophia now provides sole oversight for the strips.

TV series and films
The story of the Moomins has been made into television series on many occasions by various groups, possibly the most well known of which is a Japanese–Dutch collaboration, that has also produced a feature-length film. However, there are also two Soviet serials, puppet animation Mumi-troll (Moomintroll) and cutout animation Shlyapa Volshebnika (Magician's Hat) of three parts each, and the Polish–Austrian puppet animation TV series, The Moomins, which was broadcast and became popular in an edited form in the United Kingdom in the 1980s.

Two feature films re-use the footage of the Polish-Austrian series: Moomin and Midsummer Madness had its release in 2008, and in 2010 the Moomins appear in the first Nordic 3-D film production, with the title song by Björk, in Moomins and the Comet Chase. The animated film titled Moomins on the Riviera is based on Moomin comic strip story Moomin on the Riviera and was first released on 10 October 2014 in Finland and made its premiere on 11 October 2014 at BFI London Film Festival in United Kingdom. In an October 2014 blog article at Screendaily, Sophia Jansson states that the film's "artistic team has made an effort to be true to the original drawings and the original text".

 Die Muminfamilie (The Moomin Family) 1959 West German marionette TV series, and its 1960 sequel Sturm im Mumintal (Storm in Moominvalley)
 Mūmin (Moomin), 1969–70 Japanese anime TV series
 Mumintrollet (Moomintroll), 1969 Swedish-language suit actor TV series produced by Sveriges Radio (Swedish national radio company)
 Shin Mūmin (New Moomin), 1972 Japanese anime TV series, remake of the 1969 series by the staff of its latter half
 Mūmin (Moomin), 1971 Japanese traditional animation film
 Mūmin (Moomin), 1972 Japanese traditional animation half-hour film
 Mumindalen (Moominvalley), 1973 Swedish suit actor TV series based on Moominland Midwinter
 Mumi-troll (Moomintroll), 1978 Soviet Union stop motion serial film of Comet in Moominland
 Opowiadania Muminków (The Moomins), 1977–82 Austrian, German and Polish-produced "Fuzzy-Felt" stop motion TV series made in Poland. The series has been re-compiled a number of times in other formats:
 Moomin and Midsummer Madness, 2008 Finnish-produced compilation movie of the TV series
 Moomins and the Comet Chase, 2010 Finnish-produced 3-D film compiled and converted from the 1977–82 series
 Moomins and the Winter Wonderland, 2017, from the TV series.
 The Moomins, 2010 Finnish-produced high-definition video version of the 1977–82 series
 Vem ska trösta knyttet?, 1980 Swedish traditional animation half-hour film of Who Will Comfort Toffle?
 Shlyapa Volshebnika (Magician's Hat), 1980–83 Soviet Union cutout animation serial film of Finn Family Moomintroll, different staff and aeshetic to the 1978 serial
 Tanoshii Mūmin Ikka (Moomin), 1990–91 Dutch, Finnish and Japanese-produced traditional anime TV series made in Japan
Tanoshii Mūmin Ikka: Bōken Nikki (Delightful Moomin Family: Adventure Diary), 1991–92 Dutch and Japanese-produced traditional anime TV series made in Japan, a continuation of the 1990–91 series
Tanoshii Mūmin Ikka: Mūmindani no Suisei (Comet in Moominland), 1992 Dutch and Japanese-produced traditional anime feature film made in Japan, a prequel to the 1990–91 series
 Hur gick det sen? (What Happened Next?), 1993 Swedish short animation film of The Book about Moomin, Mymble and Little My
 Փոքրիկ տրոլների կյանքից (From the Life Of the Little Trolls), 2008 Armenian short animation film based on The Last Dragon In the World (Historien om den sista draken i världen)
 Moomins on the Riviera, 2014 French hand-drawn animated feature film, with a plot line taken from the comic strip.
 Moominvalley, 2019 Finnish and British-produced TV series, directed by Oscar-winner Steve Box. A crowdfunded campaign was made on April 19, 2017 to make a new  by Finnish company  It successfully passed the campaign threshold.

Moomin music
The Moomin novels describe the musical activities of the Moomins, particularly those of Snufkin, his harmonica with "trills" and "twiddles". All Moomin characters sing songs, often about their thoughts and themselves. The songs often serve as core statements of the characters' personalities.

Original songs

This music was heard outside Moominvalley after they went live on theater stage in Stockholm. Director Vivica Bandler told Jansson in 1959: "Listen, here the people want songs". The earlier version of the play was cast in Helsinki with no music.

Helsinki based pianist and composer Erna Tauro was commissioned to write the songs to lyrics by Jansson. The first collection consisted of six Moomin Songs (Sex muminvisor): Moomintroll's Song (Mumintrollets visa), Little My's Song (Lilla Mys visa), Mrs. Fillyjonk's Song (Fru Filifjonks sång), Theater Rat Emma's Words of Wisdom (Teaterråttan Emmas visdomsord), Misabel's Lament (Misans klagolåt) and Final Song (Slutsång).

More songs were published in the 1960s and 1970s, when Jansson and Lars Jansson produced a series of Moomin dramas for Swedish Television. The simple, yet effective melodies by Tauro were well received by the theater and TV audiences. The first songs were either sung unaccompanied or accompanied by a pianist. While the most famous Moomin songs in Scandinavia are undoubtedly "Moomintroll's Song" and "Little My's Song", they appear in no context in the novels.

The original songs by Jansson and Tauro remained scattered after their initial release. The first recording of the complete collection was made in 2003 by composer and arranger Mika Pohjola on the Moomin Voices CD (Muminröster in Swedish), as a tribute to the late Tove Jansson. Tauro had died in June 1993 and some of Jansson's last lyrics were composed by Pohjola in cooperation with Jansson's heirs. Pohjola was also the arranger of all songs for a vocal ensemble and chamber orchestra. All voices were sung by Åland native vocalist, Johanna Grüssner. The same recording has been released in a Finnish version in 2005, Muumilauluja. The Finnish lyrics were translated by Kirsi Kunnas and Vexi Salmi.

The Swedish and Finnish recordings of Moomin Voices, and their respective musical scores, have been used as course material at Berklee College of Music in Boston, Massachusetts.

The Moomin Voices Live Band (aka. Muumilauluja-bändi) is dedicated to exclusively performing the original lyrics and unaltered stories by Tove Jansson. This band is led by Pohjola on piano, with vocalists Mirja Mäkelä and Eeppi Ursin.

Other musical adaptations 
Independent musical interpretations of the Moomins have been made for the nineties anime, by Pierre Kartner, with translated versions being made including in Poland and the Nordic countries. Their lyrics, however, often contain simple slogans and the music is written in a children's pop music style and contrast sharply with the original Moomin novels and Jansson's pictorial and descriptive, yet rhyming lyricism, as well as Erna Tauro's Scandinavian-style songs (visor), which are occasionally influenced by Kurt Weill.

A Moomin opera was written in 1974 by the Finnish composer Ilkka Kuusisto; Jansson designed the costumes.

Musicscapes from Moominvalley is a four-part work based on the Moomin compositions of composer and producer Heikki Mäenpää. It was created on the basis of the original Moomin works for the Tampere Art Museum.

Twenty new Moomin songs were produced in Finland by Timo Poijärvi and Ari Vainio in 2006. This Finnish album contains no original lyrics by Jansson. However, it is based on the novel, Comet in Moominland, and adheres to the original stories. The songs are performed by Samuli Edelmann, Sani, Tommi Läntinen, Susanna Haavisto and Jore Marjaranta and other established Finnish vocalists in the pop/entertainment genre. The same twenty compositions are also available as standalone multimedia CD postcards.

The Icelandic singer Björk has composed and performed the title song (Comet Song) for the film Moomins and the Comet Chase (2010). The lyrics were written by the Icelandic writer Sjón.

In 2010, Russian composer Lex Plotnikoff (founder of symphonic metal band Mechanical Poet) released a new-age music album Hattifatteners: Stories from the Clay Shore, accompanied by photos of moomin characters models by photographer/sculptor Tisha Razumovsky. Due to copyright issues, the album was later re-released as Mistland Prattlers, with references to Moomins removed.

Theatre
Several stage productions have been made from Jansson's Moomin series, including a number that Jansson herself was involved in.

The earliest production was a 1949 theatrical version of Comet in Moominland performed at Åbo Svenska Teater.

In the early 1950s, Jansson collaborated on Moomin-themed children's plays with Vivica Bandler. By 1958, Jansson began to become directly involved in theater as Lilla Teater produced Troll i kulisserna (Troll in the wings), a Moomin play with lyrics by Jansson and music composed by Erna Tauro. The production was a success, and later performances were held in Sweden and Norway, including recently at the Malmö Opera and Music Theatre in 2011.

Mischief and Mystery in Moominvalley, a production created by Get Lost and Found which included puppetry and a giant pop-up book set, toured the UK from 2018, with runs at London's Southbank Centre, Kew Gardens and the Manchester Literature Festival. This production was written by Emma Edwards and Sophie Ellen Powell with puppets and set designed and made by Annie Brooks.

Video games

In 2000, Moomin's Tale, developed and published by Sunsoft, was released for Game Boy Color. The game is based on the 1990 TV series, and there are six different stories in the game, all of which are played by the Moomintroll.

Two video games were released for Nintendo DS, one exclusive to Japan.

On November 3, 2021, the upcoming Moomin video game called Snufkin: Melody of Moominvalley was announced. The game would be played on Snufkin and is a music-themed adventure game. The game will be developed by Norwegian-based indie game company Hyper Games. The game will be released for PC and console in 2023.

Theme parks and displays

Moomin World

Moomin World (Muumimaailma in Finnish, Muminvärlden in Swedish) is the Moomin Theme Park especially for children. Moomin World is located on the island of Kailo beside the old town of Naantali, near the city of Turku in Western Finland.

The blueberry-coloured Moomin House is the main attraction; tourists are allowed to freely visit all five stories. It is also possible to see the Hemulen's yellow house, Moominmama's kitchen, the Fire Station, Snufkin's Camp, Moominpappa's boat, etc. Visitors may also meet Moomin characters there. Moomin World opens for the Summer season.

Moomin Ice Cave 
On December 26, 2020, the underground Moomin Ice Cave theme park was opened  30 meters underneath the Spa Hotel Vesileppis in Leppävirta ( south of Kuopio). The Moomin Ice Cave includes Moomin-themed ice sculptures, downhill skiing and other activities for families with children.

Tampere Art Museum

The Moominvalley of the Tampere Art Museum is a museum devoted to the original works of Tove Jansson. It contains around 2,000 works. The museum is based on the Moomin books and has many original Moomin illustrations by Tove Jansson. The gem of the collection is a blue five-storey model of the Moominhouse, which had Tove Jansson as one of its builders. As a birthday present, the 20-year-old museum received a soundscape work based on the works of Tove Jansson, called Musicscapes from Moominvalley.

Interactive playroom
An interactive playroom about the Moomins was located at Scandinavia House, New York City, from November 11, 2006, till March 31, 2007.

Akebono Children's Forest Park 
, also called "Moomin Valley", is a Moomin themed park for children in Hannō, Saitama in Japan that opened in July, 1997. Tove Jansson had already in the 1970s given her personal permission to the city of Hannō to build a small Moomin-themed playground there.

First announced in 2013, a new Moomin theme park was opened in March 2019 at Lake Miyazawa, Hannō. There are two zones: the free Metsä Village area, comprising lakefront restaurants and shops set among natural activities, and the Moomin-themed zone offering attractions like Moominhouse and an art museum.

The theme park has become very popular, with more than one million visitors during the first three months in 2019.

Moomin shops 

As of January 2019, there are 20 Moomin Shops around the world, offering an extensive range of Moomin-themed goods. Finland, home of the Moomins, has three stores. There are two stores in the UK, one in the US, six in Japan. China and Hong Kong each have one store. There are three in South Korea and three in Thailand.

Moomin Cafes 
As of January 2018, there are 15 themed Moomin Cafes around the world – Finland, Japan, Hong Kong, Thailand, South Korea and Taiwan – allowing diners to immerse themselves in the Moomin world. Diners can enjoy Moomin-inspired meals sitting at tables with larger-than-life plush versions of Moomin characters.

Success in popular culture

The Moomin Boom ( in Finnish) started in the 1990s, when Dennis Livson and Lars Jansson produced a 104-part animation series in Japan named Tales from Moominvalley, which was followed by a full-length movie Comet in Moominland. Moomin books had always been steady bestsellers in Finland, Sweden, Estonia, Latvia and Lithuania, but the animation started a new Moomin madness both in Finland and abroad, especially in Japan, where they are the official mascots of the Daiei chain of shopping centers. A large merchandising industry was built around the Moomin characters, covering everything from coffee cups and T-shirts to plastic models. Even the former Finnish President Tarja Halonen has been known to wear a Moomin watch. New Moomin comic books and comic strips were published. Moomins were used to advertise Finland abroad: the Helsinki–Vantaa International Airport was decorated with Moomin images and Finnair decorated its aircraft on routes to Japan with Moomin designs. The peak of the Moomin Boom was the opening of the Moomin World theme park in Naantali, Finland, which has become one of Finland's international tourist destinations.

The Moomin Boom has been criticized for commercializing the Moomins. Friends of Tove Jansson and many old Moomin enthusiasts have stressed that the newer animations banalize the original and philosophical Moomin world to harmless family entertainment. An antithesis for the Disneyland-like Moomin World theme park is the Moomin Museum of Tampere, which exhibits the original illustrations and hand-made Moomin models by Tove Jansson.

The Jansson family has kept the rights of Moomins and controlled the Moomin Boom. The artistic control is now in the hands of Lars Jansson's daughter, Sophia Jansson-Zambra. Wanting to keep the control over Moomins, the family has turned down offers from the Walt Disney Company.

, the Moomin brand is estimated to have a yearly retail value of 700 million EUR per year.

References

External links

 Official website
 Unofficial Moomin Character Guide

1947 comics debuts
 
Book franchises
Books adapted into comics
Children's books adapted into films
Children's books adapted into television shows
Children's fiction books
Comics characters introduced in 1947
Fantasy books by series
Fantasy novel series
Fictional trolls
Finnish books
Finnish children's literature
Finnish comic strips
Finnish comics
Finnish culture
Finnish literature
Series of children's books
Swedish-language literature